Rui Teixeira (born 22 March 1982) is a Portuguese long-distance runner. 
In 2019, he competed in the senior men's race at the 2019 IAAF World Cross Country Championships held in Aarhus, Denmark. He finished in 42nd place.

References

External links 
 

Living people
1982 births
Place of birth missing (living people)
Portuguese male long-distance runners
Portuguese male cross country runners